Posyolok otdeleniya 2-ya Pyatiletka sovkhoza Krasnoye Znamya is a rural locality (a settlement) in Rubashevskoye Rural Settlement, Anninsky District, Voronezh Oblast, Russia. The population was 53 as of 2010. There are 2 streets.

Geography 
The settlement is located 34 km northeast of Anna (the district's administrative centre) by road. Rubashevka is the nearest rural locality.

References 

Rural localities in Anninsky District